The Adventures of Sybil Brent is a 1925 German silent film directed by Carl Froelich and starring Henny Porten, Memo Benassi and Rudolf Biebrach. It was shot at the EFA Studios in Berlin. The film's sets were designed by the art director Franz Schroedter.

Cast
 Henny Porten as Sibylle Brant, Schauspielerin
 Memo Benassi as Theo Hartwig, Schriftsteller
 Rudolf Biebrach as Aribert Brant, ihr Vater
 Harald Paulsen as Kriminalkommissar Krenke
 Henry Stuart as Kriminalkommissar Dengern
 Adolf E. Licho as Pötter, Direktor des Theatrs
 Maria Forescu as Sonja Rubenstein, Pianistin
 Sophie Pagay
 Mario Cusmich
 Carl Ebert

References

Bibliography

External links

1925 films
Films of the Weimar Republic
Films directed by Carl Froelich
German silent feature films
German black-and-white films
Films shot at Halensee Studios